Landvik is a former municipality in the old Aust-Agder county in Norway. The  municipality existed from 1838 until its dissolution in 1971. The municipality's area is now located in the western and central part of the present-day municipality of Grimstad. The administrative centre was the village of Roresanden, just up the hill from the Landvik Church.  Other villages in Landvik include Molland, Reddal, Skiftenes, Tjore, and Østerhus.  Today, the name Landvik is still used to designate the westernmost part of the municipality of Grimstad, near the Prestegårdskogen housing development.

History
The parish of Hommedal was established as a municipality on 1 January 1838 (see formannskapsdistrikt law). In 1865, the municipality was renamed Landvig.  Originally, the municipal council met at the Torp farm in Reddal. Starting in the 1840s, the council met at the Landvik farm near the church. In 1876, the council began meeting at the Vikmarken school, just south of Roresanden. On 1 January 1883, the uninhabited Tolleholmen part of neighboring Birkenes municipality was transferred to Landvik. In 1956, the municipal council began meeting at the Landvik herredshus in Roresanden.

During the 1960s, there were many municipal mergers across Norway due to the work of the Schei Committee. On 1 January 1962, the uninhabited area of Salvestjønn in neighboring Øyestad municipality and most of the municipality of Eide (504 inhabitants) were merged into the municipality of Landvik.  After the merger, Landvik had a total of 2,433 residents.

Then on 1 January 1971, the neighboring municipalities of Landvik and Fjære were merged with the town of Grimstad to create a new, larger municipality of Grimstad. Prior to the merger, Landvik had a population of 2,781.

Name
The municipality (and parish) is named after the old Landvig farm since that is where the local church was located.  The first element of the name means "land" and the last element is identical with the modern Norwegian word  which means "inlet".  The farm is located on a bay on the northeast side of the Landvikvannet lake.  From 1838 until 1865, the municipality was named Hommedal. In 1865, it was changed to Landvig, and in the 20th century the spelling was adjusted to Landvik.

Government
All municipalities in Norway, including Landvik, are responsible for primary education (through 10th grade), outpatient health services, senior citizen services, unemployment and other social services, zoning, economic development, and municipal roads. The municipality was governed by a municipal council of elected representatives, which in turn elected a mayor.

Municipal council
The municipal council  of Landvik was made up of representatives that were elected to four year terms.  The party breakdown of the final municipal council was as follows:

Maps

See also
List of former municipalities of Norway

References

External links

Grimstad
Former municipalities of Norway
1838 establishments in Norway
1971 disestablishments in Norway